Calopteryx japonica is a species of broad-winged damselfly in the family Calopterygidae. It is found in East Asia (Russian Far East, Japan, Korea, and eastern China).

References

Further reading

 

Calopterygidae
Odonata of Asia
Taxa named by Edmond de Sélys Longchamps
Insects described in 1869
Articles created by Qbugbot